Alanngorsuaq Fjord, also known as Coppermine Bay, is a fjord in the Kujalleq municipality in southern Greenland. At the mouth of the fjord the coastline of southwestern Greenland turns to the east towards Qaqortoq.

Geography 
Alanngorsuaq Fjord opens towards the west a few miles north of Cape Desolation. The Inner Kitsissut islands lie on the southern side of the mouth of the bay. 

Settlement 
The shores of the fjord are uninhabited.

The fjord marked the southern limit of the former Frederikshåb District, now Paamiut. It was named 'Coppermine Bay' after a pioneer mining operation in Southwestern Greenland at the beginning of the 20th century.

See also
Bluie West Seven
List of fjords of Greenland

References

External links 

Explanatory notes to the Geological map of Greenland
1:1,000,000 scale Operational Navigation Chart, Sheet B-8, 3rd edition

Fjords of Greenland